Sony Corporation (commonly known as Sony) produces professional, consumer, and prosumer camcorders such as studio and broadcast, digital cinema cameras, camcorders, pan-tilt-zoom and remote cameras.

Standard definition models

Sony DCR-VX1000

The VX1000, introduced in 1995, was the first digital consumer MiniDV camcorder. It is also widely used by professional skateboarding videographers. Century Optics designed the Mk1 fisheye lens just for the VX1000. The VX1000 excels at daytime colors.

Sony DCR-TRV900/DSR-PD100

These models gained wide-scale popularity when paired with Century Optics Mk1 or Mk2.

Sony DCR-VX2000 & Sony DSR-PD150

The VX2000/PD150 sister models improved on the VX1000 in low light sensitivity and added LCD screen. Both models have 1/3" CCD sensors while the PD150 has XLR audio inputs and independent iris and gain controls.

Sony DCR-TRV950/Sony DSR-PDX10

Sony DCR-VX2100 & Sony DSR-PD170
The VX2100/PD170 improved on the VX2000/PD150 models with low light sensitivity of 1 lux, improved LCD screen, and 24 iris increments from 12.

Older high definition models

HDC Series System Cameras

Sony HDC-700 Series 
Introduced in 1998 for HDTV video broadcast era. HDC-700A/750A were Sony HDVS compatible and equipped with 2 million pixel frame-interline-transfer (FIT) CCD imager that could capture 1080 of active lines per frame. For sensitivity, it achieved F8.0 at 2000 lux. HDC-700A Series inherits many of the main features of the field proven SDTV Sony BVP-700/500 Series cameras.

 Sony HDC-700A - HD studio/OB camera
 Sony HDC-750A - HD portable companion camera
 Sony HDC700A/L
 Sony HDCU-700A

Sony HDC-900 Series 
Introduced in 2000.

 HDC-900/910

Sony HDC-1000 Series

Point of view cameras 

 Sony DXC-H10 is a small HDVS (high definition video system) point of view HD camera introduced in 1998 capable of recording 1000 TV lines of resolution and weighs 1.2 kg.

Sony HDR-HC1

The Sony HDR-HC1, introduced in mid-2005 (MSRP $1999 US), was the first HDV CMOS camcorder to support 1080i. The CMOS sensor has a resolution of 1920x1440 for digital still pictures and captures video at 1440x1080 interlaced. The camera supports digital image stabilization.

The camcorder can convert captured HDV data to DV data for editing using non-linear editing systems which do not support HDV or for creating edits which are viewable on non-HDTV television sets.

The HVR-A1 is the prosumer version of the HDR-HC1, having additional manual controls and XLR ports.

Sony HDR-HC5

The Sony HDR-HC5, introduced in May 2007 (MSRP $1099 US), was the third DV tape HDV CMOS camcorder to support 1080i. The 1/3" CMOS sensor has a resolution of 2MP and interlaced 4MP for digital still pictures and captures video at 1440x1080 interlaced. Digital photos can be stored on a Sony Memory Stick. It requires a minimum of 2Lux.

Sony HDR-HC7
The Sony HDR-HC7, introduced in 2008 (MSRP $1399 US), was another DV tape HDV CMOS camcorder to support 1080i. The 1/2.9 CMOS sensor has a resolution of 3MP and interlaced 6.1MP for digital still pictures and captures video at 1440x1080 interlaced.

The camera includes a manual focus wheel, mic and headphone jacks, and a slightly larger imaging sensor, producing 3200K gross pixels versus the HC5' 2100K. The HC7 also sports Sony's Super SteadyShot Optical Image Stabilization System.

In December 2007, Sony released the HD1000, the shoulder mount version of the HC7. Its advantage include much more stable off-tripod footage; full-size zoom control; custom ring to manually control focusing, exposure (iris and gain), zoom, or shutter speed; support for a large video light on its front coldshoe; and wireless audio.

Sony HDR-FX1

The Sony HDR-FX1, introduced in late 2004, was the first HDV 3 CCD camcorder to support 1080i (1440 X 1080 resolution with 4:2:0 color sampling). The Sony HVR-Z1U is the "professional" version of this camera with additional features such as balanced XLR audio inputs, DVCAM recording, and extended DSP capabilities (i.e. cine/gamma controls).

The HDR-FX1 includes three 1/3-inch 16:9 1.12 Megapixel gross CCDs. Each CCD measures 1012 x 1111 pixels total, 972 x 1100 effective. It includes a 12x optical zoom Carl Zeiss Vario-Sonnar T* lens, a 3.5-inch LCD screen, a zoom ring, focus ring, and an iris / aperture adjustment knob.

Cineframe
The FX1 offers Cineframe shooting modes at 30 and 24 frames per second. The camera uses an interlaced image but extracts progressive images from individual fields by doubling them. The 30fps and 24fps do not offer the same resolution as true progressive scanning. The 24fps Cineframe shooting mode does not offer the same resolution, or motion cadence as true 24fps progressive scanning.

Known Flaw
When the audio mode of HDR-FX1/HDR-FX1E camcorder is switched to the 16-bit setting (in DV mode) and the unit is then turned off, the unit resets to the default 12-bit setting, though the LCD indicator of the unit continues to display the 16-bit audio setting.

Sony HDR-FX7
The Sony HDR-FX7, was introduced in September 2006. The new camcorder is the first camcorder below $3,000 to offer full 1080 HD resolution with a three-chip sensor.

 Resolution: Sony claims "full" 1080 HD
 Sensor: changed to 3 x 1/4" ClearVid CMOS
 Light sensitivity: worse by 33% (4lux)
 Zoom: increased to 20x optical zoom (30x digital)
 Lens/filter: decreased to 62mm/bayonet mount
 Optical Image Stabilizator (OIS, SteadyShot 4 settings)
 Video out: included HDMI
 Weight: reduced to 1.6 kg (3.52 lb.)

The company claims that HDR-FX7 has much improved resolution (full 1080 HD) under good lighting. In low-light situations, Sony FX1 will still produce better results.

Sony HDR-SR1/HDR-SR5/HDR-SR7
The Sony HDR-SR1, introduced in late 2006, was Sony's first high definition hard disk drive based camcorder. It launched with a 30 gigabyte internal drive and - along with the Sony HDR-UX1 - is the first camcorder that records high definition video in AVCHD format. In June 2007, Sony released two new AVCHD format HD Hard Disk camcorders, a 40GB (HDR-SR5) and 60GB model (HDR-SR7). All three have the ability to record Dolby Digital 5.1.

Newer high definition models

Sony HDR-CX7
In June 2007, Sony released the HDR-CX7, the first Sony AVCHD camcorder to record video to a memory card. The product comes bundled with a 4GB Memory Stick Duo that holds 30 mins of HD video.

Sony HDR-CX7 weighs 15 ounces with the supplied battery and can record nearly one hour of full HD 1080 video on an 8-GB memory. It can record longer videos at lower resolution or quality.

This handycam features a crash-proof recording system. It is equipped with a 6.1-megapixel CMOS image sensor and a 5.4-54mm/F1.8-2.9 zoom lens.

It saves files with a resolution of 1440 * 1080i. The video format specifies a rectangular pixel shape. Most players render this as 1920 * 1080 format after adjusting for the rectangular pixels.

For this camera, the maximum recording rate is 15 Mbit/s.

Sony HDR-CX12
In August 2008, Sony released the successor to the HDR-CX7, the HDR-CX12, with a retail price of $899.99.

Major features include:
 1920x1080i Recording
 1/3" ClearVid CMOS sensor
 Dolby Digital 5.1 audio
 10.2MP still image capture
 Face Detection and Smile Shutter technology

Sony HDR-CX500V
Sony released the HDR-CX500V in 2009. The CX500V added GPS tagging capability, a new 1/2.8-inch sensor, and enhanced optical image stabilization.

Sony HVR-Z1
The Sony HVR-Z1 is a professional, broadcast quality, HDV camcorder. It is popular for producers of documentaries and other television programs because of its small size and relatively low cost. It records in 1080i.

It uses the DV recording format however it can record in DV, DVCAM and HDV versions of the format. It can also record in PAL (25 frames) and NTSC (30 frames).

Sony HVR-Z5
The Sony HVR-Z5 was introduced in October 2008. It uses Sony's new G-Lens, alongside the 3 ClearVid CMOS Sensor system, which works well in low light. The HVR-Z5E can switch between HDV 1080i, DVCAM and standard DV recording.

Sony HVR-Z7/HVR-S270
The Sony HVR-Z7 and HVR-S270 video cameras, introduced in early 2008, were the first 3 CMOS sensor HDV camcorder that records on tape and/or CF card. In previous prosumer models, Sony released model pairs that shared the same optics and sensors, such as the VX2000/PD150, VX2100/PD170, Z1/FX1, and V1/FX7; where the VX/FX was the consumer version and the PD/Z was the professional/prosumer version. The consumer models lacked professional features such as XLR inputs and some manual controls. The HVR-Z7 breaks this pattern as it has all professional features of previous prosumer models, and has no consumer equivalent, although it has a larger shoulder-mounted sister camera, the HVR-S270.

Both video cameras feature interchangeable lenses. They attain low light sensitivity similar to the SD low light leader, the Sony DSR-PD170, and offer interlaced and progressive recording in HDV, DVCAM, and DV formats. Compact Flash recording is achieved by a supplied CF card recorder that is removable and connects via a proprietary firewire connection or 6 pin firewire.

Sony HDR-FX1000/HVR-Z5
The first true successors to the HDR-FX1 and the HVR-Z1, the HDR-FX1000 and HVR-Z5 were released in autumn 2008. They employ the same Exmor 1/3" 3CMOS design as the Z7/S270, and the Z5 is bundled with the same CF card recorder as the Z7, but the physical designs more closely resemble that of the FX1 and Z1.

Both models support interlaced and progressive scan recording. HVR-Z5 has native progressive recording. Both models have the 1-megapixel XtraFine LCD screen included in the EX1, Z7, and SR11/12. These camcorders introduced Sony G Lenses. The zoom range extends 20x, 29.5-595 35mm equivalent. It has a wider view angle than most fixed lenses in this price range.

Sony HDR-GW

The Sony HDR-GW55 was introduced in 2012 and is designed to be held vertically. It is marketed as a waterproof, dustproof and shockresistant Full HD camcorder. It can withstand up to a depth of 5m and accidental drops from 1.5m of height. It comes with a 10 × optical zoom lens. It has a GPS function for geolocating photos and videos.

Its successor, the HDR-GW66, was released in 2013. It has improved waterproof capabilities. It can withstand up to a depth of 10 meters and temperatures as cold as −10 °C. It uses a larger battery which increases recording time considerably. A front button was added for improved usability.

High-definition 3D models

Sony HDR-TD10
The TD10 is Sony's first 3D AVCHD camcorder. It records on an internal 64 GB hard drive or onto Sony Memory Stick Pro memory cards, or onto SDHC cards. Released in 2011, it can record a maximum of 28 Mbit/s in 3D or 2D. Its two sensors are 1/4" (4.5 mm) and each has gross 4200K pixels, can produce a maximum 5.3-megapixel image in 16:9 (3072x1728).

Sony HDR-TD20V
The TD20 is Sony's second generation of 3D AVCHD camcorder. It has been modified mainly to be a little smaller than TD10 and they also shortened distance between lenses, which makes the 3D effect a little less significant, but it is compensated with internal software. It records on internal 64 GB hard disk or onto Sony Memory Stick Pro storage cards, or onto SDHC cards. Released in 2012, it can record to max 28 Mbit/s in 3D or 2D. Its two sensors are 1/3.91" (4.6 mm) and each has gross 5430K pixels, and can produce a maximum 20.4-megapixel image in 16:9 (6016x3384).

Sony HDR-TD30V
The TD30 is Sony's third iteration of the TD10 model. It records only onto Sony Memory Stick Pro memory cards, or onto SDHC cards. Sony removed the manual focus knob. Released in 2013, it can record a maximum of 28 Mbit/s in 3D or 2D. Its two sensors are 1/3.91" (4.6 mm) and each has gross 5430K pixels, can produce a maximum 20.4-megapixel image in 16:9 (6016×3384).

High definition 'NX' range

Sony HXR-NX5
The NX5 is Sony's first professional AVCHD camcorder. It records either onto Sony Memory Stick Pro memory cards, or onto SDHC cards. An optional 128Gb Flash Memory unit provides up to 11 hours of recording time. It can record in Standard Definition using MPEG2 format, or up to 1920 x 1080 images at 24Mbit/s in High Definition mode in the AVCHD format. The camera is almost identical to the HVR-Z5, some people calling it the 'Tapeless version of the Z5'.

Sony HXR-MC50E
This compact camera comes with a 3.5mm audio input – not a balanced XLR input. It records up to 6 hours of full HD on 64Gb internal memory.

Ultra high definition models
Camcorders that support resolution of 3840×2160 (UHD also known as 4K).

Sony FDR-AX100
In January 2014, Sony released its first consumer UHD Camcorder. The AX100 is able to capture video at 3840×2160 resolution at 30p using a 1" Exmor R CMOS sensor. It uses a full sensor readout instead of line skipping which provides very high detail with minimal aliasing or moiré. It captures video using 14MP and then resizes the image to 8MP. It can capture photos at 20 MP. The highest quality video output uses XAVC S format based on MPEG-4 AVC/H.264 compression. Typical data rates are about 60 Mbit/s in this mode (100 Mbit/s in the firmware version 3.00). The SDXC memory card class 10 is required for XAVC S recording (SDXC class 10 U3 is required for 100 Mbit/s recording).

The Zeiss Vario Sonnar T* Lens provides a 12x optical zoom which starts at 29mm equivalent wide-angle. There is an optional 24x Clear Image zoom which zooms by using a smaller number of pixels until it matches the resolution of the output. Digital zoom can extend to 160x although with progressively degrading quality. Optical SteadyShot Image Stabilization has an optional mode called Intelligent Active Mode which using digital techniques on top of the optical stabilization to stabilize even more aggressively. The AX100 has neutral density filters built into the camera which is rare for a consumer camera. It can be set to automatic or manual control with the following settings: Off, 1/4, 1/16, and 1/64.

The AX100 provides both an EVF (0.39" OLED) and LCD screen (3.5" 0.921 MP). The multi-interface accessory shoe allows connection to an external flash or stereo microphones. The remote control interface is available via the multi-terminal port.

Sony FDR-AX33
In March 2015, Sony released this smaller, lighter weight UHD camcorder using a 1/2.3" sensor with many of the same features as the AX100. With this camcorder, Sony introduced "Balanced Optical SteadyShot" (BOSS), essentially a floating lens/sensor block combination to reduce shake. It comes with a 10x lens. Along with the reduced size is the reduced size EVF (0.24") and LCD screen (3.0" 0.921 MP).

Sony FDR-AX53
Introduced in 2016, this camcorder improves on the previous versions with the addition of bigger pixels in the same 1/2.5 sensor, hot shoe for an external microphone accessory, and in addition to optical steady shot, there is now 5 axis sensor stabilization, but it's disabled in 4k.

 Sony spec page
 Sony Press Conference Introducing the camera

Digital Cinema Cameras 

 Sony Venice
 Sony Venice 2 - Full-frame digital cinema camera with internal X-OCN recording and possibility to use 8K or 6K sensors.

Camcorder with built-in projector 

In 2011, Sony released 3 camcorders with a built-in projector at the back of the LCD panel that can display images up to 60 inches away onto non-transparent flat surface in front of the camcorder. HDR-PJ50V, HDR-PJ30V and HDR-PJ10 have the same specifications, except memory. They have 220GB internal hard drive, 32GB flash memory and 16GB flash memory respectively. The 1/4-inch CMOS sensor camcorders have 12 optical zoom lenses and can record 1080/60p video, slot for SD/SDHC/SDXC or Memory Stick PRO Duo memory cards and GPS (except HDR-PJ10).

In 2012, Sony released 2 camcorders with a built-in projector. HDR-PJ200 lacks internal memory, microphone jack and surround sound recording. The Sony HDR-PJ260 offers improved features such as an 8.9 megapixel still camera but includes 16GB internal memory. More expensive models include the HDR-PJ580, HDR-PJ600 and HDR-PJ760.

See also
 Sony Handycam
 CineAlta
 Sony Action Cam

References

External links

 
Sony